Target Tokyo is a 22-minute film produced by the US Air Force and portraying the travels of an aircraft bomber and its crew from training in the U.S. and Saipan to the bombing of Tokyo. It was partially shot in Saipan, thus becoming the first example of a cinema of Northern Mariana Islands. Future U.S. president Ronald Reagan was the narrator. General Henry H. Arnold starred as himself.

References

External links

1945 films
American World War II propaganda shorts
Black-and-white documentary films
Documentary films about military aviation
Films directed by William Keighley
First Motion Picture Unit films
American black-and-white films
Films shot in the Northern Mariana Islands
American short documentary films
1940s short documentary films
1940s English-language films
1940s American films